José Guadalupe Galván Galindo (21 August 1941 – 16 July 2022) was a Mexican Roman Catholic prelate.

Galván Galindo was born in Mexico and was ordained to the priesthood in 1965. He served as bishop of the Roman Catholic Diocese of Ciudad Valles, Mexico from 1994 to 2000 and as bishop of the Roman Catholic Diocese of Torreón, Mexico from 2000 until his retirement in 2017.

References

External links

1941 births
2022 deaths
Mexican Roman Catholic bishops
20th-century Roman Catholic bishops in Mexico
21st-century Roman Catholic bishops in Mexico
Bishops appointed by Pope John Paul II
People from San Luis Potosí
People from Durango